Decticus is a genus of bush-cricket in the subfamily Tettigoniinae.

Distribution
Species of this genus are present in Europe, in Asia and in North Africa.

Species
The Orthoptera Species File lists:
 Decticus albifrons (Fabricius, 1775)
 Decticus annaelisae Ramme, 1929
 Decticus hieroglyphicus Klug, 1829
 Decticus loudoni Ramme, 1933
 Decticus nigrescens Tarbinsky, 1930
 Decticus verrucivorus (Linnaeus, 1758) - type species (D. verrucivorus verrucivorus)

References

 Fauna Europaea
 Catalogue of Life
 NCBI orthoptera-stub

Tettigoniidae genera